A test match in netball is an international match played between two senior national teams, that is recognised as such by at least one of the teams' national governing bodies. The relatively recent use of the term in netball is analogous to its long-standing use in Test cricket: netball Tests are played between Australia, New Zealand, England and South Africa, all of which have a long history of playing cricket Test matches.

References

Netball terminology
Netball